Nomada edwardsii is a species of nomad bee in the family Apidae. It is found in Central America and North America.

Subspecies
These two subspecies belong to the species Nomada edwardsii:
 Nomada edwardsii edwardsii Cresson, 1878
 Nomada edwardsii vinnula Cresson, 1879

References

Further reading

 

Nomadinae
Articles created by Qbugbot
Insects described in 1878